The bust of Georg Solti is an outdoor bronze sculpture by Elisabeth Frink, installed in Chicago, in the U.S. state of Illinois.

History
A bronze bust of Sir Georg Solti by Elisabeth Frink was dedicated in Lincoln Park, Chicago, outside the Lincoln Park Conservatory on October 10, 1987, commemorating the conductor's seventy-fifth birthday. It was first displayed temporarily at the Royal Opera House in London. The sculpture was moved to Grant Park and rededicated in October 2006 in the Sir Georg Solti Garden, near Symphony Center, home of the Chicago Symphony Orchestra.

See also
 List of public art in Chicago

References

Bronze sculptures in Illinois
Busts in Illinois
Monuments and memorials in Chicago
Outdoor sculptures in Chicago
Sculptures by Elisabeth Frink
Sculptures of men in Illinois